Robert Zachary Lawrence (born 1949) is a South Africa-born American economist and Albert L. Williams Professor of International Trade and Investment at John F. Kennedy School of Government at Harvard University. He is also a senior fellow at the Peterson Institute for International Economics, and a research associate at the National Bureau of Economic Research.

Lawrence was appointed to President Bill Clinton’s Council of Economic Advisers from March 1999 to January 2001. Since then, Lawrence has held the New Century Chair as a non-resident senior fellow at the Brookings Institution and founded and edited the Brookings Trade Forum. He is also the director of the Harvard Kennedy School Trade Group and the faculty chair of Kennedy School Executive Programs.

He immigrated to the United States in 1971 and studied at Yale University where he received his Ph.D. in Economics in 1978. He has written over 100 papers and articles on topics in the field of international economics. His recent research has focused on global integration and the impact of trade on the labor market.

Other notable assignments
 Senior fellow in the Economic Studies Program at the Brookings Institution (1983–91)
 Research Associate at Brookings (1976–82), an instructor at Yale University (1975)
 Professorial lecturer at the Johns Hopkins School of Advanced International Studies (1978–81)
 Consultant to the Federal Reserve Bank of New York
 Consultant to the World Bank
 Consultant to the OECD
 Consultant to the UNCTAD
 Member of the Presidential Commission on United States Pacific Trade and Investment Policy
 Member of the advisory committees of the Institute for International Economics
 Member of the Panel on Foreign Trade Statistics of the National Academy of Sciences
 Member of the Committee for Economic Development
 Member of the Overseas Development Council
 Member of the Panel of Economic Advisors of the Congressional Budget Office
 Chair for the Project on Middle East Trade at the Institute for Social and Economic Policy in the Middle East, John F. Kennedy School of Government

Selected publication and citations

Books
 Lawrence, Robert Z. Regionalism, Multilateralism, and Deeper Integration. The Brookings Institution, 1996.
 Lawrence, Robert Z., and Ahmed Galal. Anchoring Reform with a US-Egypt Free Trade Agreement. Institute for International Economics, May 2005.
 Bradford, Scott, and Robert Z. Lawrence. Has Globalization Gone Far Enough? The Costs of Fragmentation in OECD Markets. Institute for International Economics, 2004.
 Robert Z. Lawrence. Crimes and Punishments? Retaliation under the WTO. Institute for International Economics, 2003.

Book chapters
 Lawrence, Robert Z., and Juan Lara. "Puerto Rico: Trade Performance and Industrial Policy." The Economy of Puerto Rico: Restoring Growth. Ed. Susan M. Collins, Barry Bosworth, and Miguel A. Soto-Class. Brookings Institution Press and the Center for the New Economy, 2006.
 Lawrence, Robert Z. "Inequality in America: The Recent Evidence." Cross-Border Human Resources, Labor and Employment Issues: Proceedings of the New York University 54th Annual Conference on Labor Law. Ed. Andrew P. Morriss, Samuel Estreicher. Kluwer Law International, June 2005, 581–88

Research papers/reports
 Lawrence, Richard Z. "Recent US Free Trade Initiatives in the Middle East: Opportunities but no Guarantees." KSG Faculty Research Working Paper Series RWP06-050, December 2006.
 Lawrence, Robert Z. "China and the Multilateral Trading System." KSG Faculty Research Working Paper Series RWP06-045, October 2006.
 Lawrence, Robert Z., and Tatiana Rosito. "A New Compensation Mechanism for Preference Erosion in the Doha Round." KSG Faculty Research Working Paper Series RWP06-044, October 2006.
 Lawrence, Robert Z., and Tatiana Rosito. "A New Compensation Mechanism for Preference Erosion in the Doha Round." Center for International Development Blue Sky Conference paper, September 2006.

Reviews
 Lawrence, Robert Z. Comment on "Designing Policies to Capture Beneficial Effects" in Does Foreign Direct Investment Promote Development?, Ed. Theodore H. Moran, Edward M. Graham, Magnus Blomström. 2005: 367–71.

References

External links
 Faculty Profile at Kennedy School Web Site
  Council of Economic Advisors
 

1949 births
People from Brookline, Massachusetts
South African emigrants to the United States
Harvard Kennedy School faculty
People from Johannesburg
Yale University alumni
United States Council of Economic Advisers
Living people
20th-century South African economists
Economists from Massachusetts
21st-century American economists
Peterson Institute for International Economics